Olenecamptus indicus is a species of beetle in the family Cerambycidae. The species was first described by Stephan von Breuning in 1936, originally under the genus Cylindrepomus.  They have since been reclassified as part of the Olenecamptus genus.

References

Dorcaschematini
Beetles described in 1936